The 12 cm felthaubits/m32 was a howitzer used by Norway in World War II. Captured guns were given a German designation after the Invasion of Norway as the 12 cm leFH 376(n). Two batteries of Artillerie-Abteilung 477, which served in Finland during the war, were equipped with 12 cm Norwegian howitzers, which might included these guns.

Eight were built during the 1930s to replace the obsolescent Rheinmetall 12 cm leFH 08, which was known in Norwegian service as the 12 cm felthaubits/m08. They served with the single heavy artillery battalion of the Norwegian Army in 1940, but were unable to get ammunition during the campaign and were evacuated into Sweden, according to one source.

It was equipped with rubber-rimmed steel wheels for motorized towing.

References 
 Gander, Terry and Chamberlain, Peter. Weapons of the Third Reich: An Encyclopedic Survey of All Small Arms, Artillery and Special Weapons of the German Land Forces 1939-1945. New York: Doubleday, 1979 
 Chamberlain, Peter & Gander, Terry. Heavy Artillery. New York: Arco, 1975

External links
 Norwegian artillery on Norway 1940
 Independent Artillery Units on Panzerkeil

120 mm artillery
Howitzers
World War II artillery of Norway